Broadview is a community in Saskatchewan along the Highway 1, the Trans-Canada Highway,  east of Regina.  The local economy is based mainly on agriculture. It is also the administrative headquarters of the Rural Municipality of Elcapo No. 154

History 
The North-West Mounted Police  (NWMP) set up a divisional post in Broadview in 1885. Sergeant Bill, a goat from Broadview, served as the mascot for the 5th Battalion, CEF, during World War I. The goat received a decoration, and after its passing resides now in the Broadview Museum. The Broadview railway station was designated a historic railway station in 1992.

Geography 
Broadview is located in the Indian Head Plain of the Aspen Parkland ecoregion. The physiographic region is the Qu'Appelle plains in the Saskatchewan Plains physiographic region. Broadview is within the topographical area of Weed Hills. The bedrock geology belongs to that of the Mannville Group, a stratigraphical unit of Cretaceous age in the Western Canadian Sedimentary Basin formed during the lower Cretaceous period. The area is characterised by lush rolling grasslands, interspersed with poplar bluffs and open sloughs. The Cowessess, Kahkewistahaw, Ochapowace Indian reserves are within  of Broadview. Highway 201 provides access to Bird's Point Recreation Site and Crooked Lake Provincial Park, which are located in the Qu'Appelle Valley.

Climate 
Broadview has a humid continental climate, with extreme seasonal temperatures. Annually, temperatures exceed  on an average in late July  Typically, summer lasts from late June until late August, and the humidity is seldom uncomfortably high. Winter lasts from November to March, and varies greatly in length and severity. Spring and autumn are both short and highly variable.

Demographics 

Government 
The town of Broadview has a mayor as the highest ranking government official. The town also elects aldermen or councillors to form the municipal council.  Currently the mayor is Sidney Criddle, and is serving with councillors Lori Stephan, Esther Bonk, Brent Bagshaw, Terry Fitzgerald, Tracy Strachan.  The town administrator is Mervin Schmidt.

Provincially, Broadview is within the constituency of Moosomin served by their Member of legislative assembly, Steven Bonk.

Federally the Souris--Moose Mountain riding is represented by their Member of Parliament, Robert Kitchen.

Economy 
The Mainline Regional Economic Development Authority provides assistance and business advice for Broadview and the Rural Municipality of Elcapo No. 154.

Infrastructure

Transportation 

Broadview was the western terminus of the Canadian Pacific Railway in 1882, and later went on to become a major divisional point for the CPR. Broadview was located on the CPR West line between Regina (Indian Head subdivision) and Winnipeg, Manitoba (Broadview subdivision).  The line ran through Wolseley, Summerberry, Grenfell, Oakshela, Broadview, it continued east through Percival, Whitewood and Burrows. At Broadview in 1925, the time zone changed from Central Standard Time to Mountain Standard Time. The Canadian Pacific Railway station building was declared a historic railway station in 1992

The original grade which the 1882 rail was built upon was abandoned in favour of a better grade, and an historical marker commemorates the old rail track.

Department of Transportation aerodrome 
The Broadview aerodrome was located approximately three miles south of the town. The aerodrome was listed as a Turf, all way field with three runways were listed as follows:

Education 
Currently Broadview school serves an enrolled population of about 150 students between Kindergarten to Grade 12 is a part of Prairie Valley School Division No. 208.  Broadview school division office is located in Broadview.

Broadview School #5 was established 1885, followed by Meadow Lea #55, Forest Farm #90, Spring Lake #153, Spring Lake #153, Clifton #278, Highland #437,  River Ayr 534, Northwood #2988,  Elcapo #3013,  Kingsley #3916, Weed Creek #4352, Logwood #4924. Historically Cowesses Day School was situated near Broadview.  The Highland One Room Schoolhouse is preserved in the Broadview museum.

Parks and recreation 
It is a rest area with a picnic area and washrooms.

Celebration Park comes equipped with baseball diamonds, tennis courts, rodeo ground, horseshoe pits, and a children's playground. Broadview also features a natural ice-skating and hockey rink, Broadview Curling Club, and the nine-hole Broadview Golf Club.

Museum 

The Broadview Historical Museum, which opened on July 15, 1972, features the Highland One Room Schoolhouse a reconstructed sod house, the Delorme family's one-room log cabin, extensive indoor and outdoor installations of numerous Cree and settler archives, artifacts, and war memorabilia, including Sergeant Bill, "Saskatchewan's most famous goat". Archival photos and documents include agricultural, military, settler, and Cree history and heritage including genealogical resources.

Notable people 
John Hall Archer was a Canadian librarian, historian, and civil servant, and the first President of the University of Regina.

Location

See also
List of communities in Saskatchewan
List of towns in Saskatchewan

References

External links 

Towns in Saskatchewan
Elcapo No. 154, Saskatchewan
Division No. 5, Saskatchewan